Lambert is a lunar impact crater on the southern half of the Mare Imbrium basin. It was named after Swiss polymath Johann Heinrich Lambert. It lies to the east and somewhat south of the slightly larger crater Timocharis. To the south is the smaller Pytheas, and some distance to the west-southwest is Euler.

The crater is relatively easy to locate due to its isolated position on the mare. It has an outer rampart, terraced inner walls, and a rough interior that has a comparable albedo to its surroundings. Instead of a central peak, a small craterler lies at the midpoint of the interior.

Just to the south of Lambert's ramparts is the lava-covered rim of Lambert R, a crater that is almost completely covered by the mare. The diameter of this ghost crater is larger than Lambert, but it is difficult to spot except when the Sun is at a very low angle, casting long shadows.

Satellite craters
By convention these features are identified on lunar maps by placing the letter on the side of the crater midpoint that is closest to Lambert.

References

External links

 LTO-40A3 Lambert — L&PI topographic map of crater and vicinity.

Impact craters on the Moon
Mare Imbrium